{{DISPLAYTITLE:Psi3 Aquarii}}

Psi3 Aquarii, Latinized from ψ3 Aquarii, is the Bayer designation for a visual binary star system in the constellation of Aquarius. It has an apparent visual magnitude of 4.98, which is bright enough to be seen with the naked eye.

The main component of this system is an A-type main sequence star with a stellar classification of A0 V. Its companion is an 11th magnitude star 1.5 arcseconds from the primary. This radiation most likely comes from the companion star.

References

External links
 Image Psi3 Aquarii

Aquarii, Psi3
Aquarii, 095
219832
Aquarius (constellation)
Binary stars
A-type main-sequence stars
115115
8865
BD-10 6094